Luciano Barbera is a high-end men’s clothing company based in Biella, Italy, a town and commune in the northern Italian region of Piedmont.

History 
Prior to producing a clothing company, the Barbera family owned and operated the Carlo Barbera Mill, also located in Biella, Italy.

In 1962, Luciano Barbera (son of Carlo Barbera) was photographed by Vogue in a suit made with his family's fabrics. Years later, the owner of the US menswear store LouisBoston offered Luciano to sell his line of clothes, which led the latter to create his clothing brand.  In 1971, the Luciano Barbera brand of men's clothes was created, using the Carlo Barbera fabrics to make the clothes.

In 2010 the reported average price of fabric from the Carlo Barbera factory was 41 euros a meter ($48.75 a yard). That same year, the company had a $5.8 million debt and was short on orders to settle it, and the mill fabric was acquired by the Napolitan company Kiton. The brand started to be distributed online through Amazon's MyHabit.

In 2014, the US equity fund Tengram Capital Partners acquired a majority stake in Luciano Barbera and named Todd Barrato as CEO. In 2019, Tengram Capital Partners sold its majority stake in Luciano Barbera to Philippe Camperio, who had acquired the Italian hat company Borsalino the previous year.

Description 

The initial fabric factory in Biella, Italy,  was founded by Carlo Barbera (1911–2013). After dying, the yarn was rested six months while it regained humidity before weaving in order to obtain the best results.

There is a Luciano Barbera store and showroom in Milan on Via Gesù, the popular men’s clothing street.

In the popular culture 
In the movie Salt, Angelina Jolie wears Luciano Barbera clothes.

References

External links 

Companies based in Biella
Luxury brands
Barbera
High fashion brands
Clothing companies established in 1970
Italian suit makers
Italian companies established in 1970
Textile companies of Italy